An electric cooker is an electric powered cooking device for heating and cooking of food.
An electric cooker often has four stoves and one or two ovens. There will be knobs to determine the temperature of the ovens and stoves. Unlike gas stoves that are powered by gas, it is powered by electricity. Usually they have four rings on top of the hob, similar to most gas cookers.

Besides stoves or ranges, common types include hot plates, slow cookers (or crock pots), electric toasters, rice cookers, electric teakettles, and the now obsolete Dub Cookers.

See also
Cooker
Electric stove

References

Cooking appliances